Isoquercetin, isoquercitrin or isotrifoliin is a flavonoid, a type of chemical compound. It is the 3-O-glucoside of quercetin. Isoquercitrin can be isolated from various plant species including Mangifera indica (mango) and Rheum nobile (the Noble rhubarb). It is also present in the leaves of Annona squamosa, Camellia sinensis (tea). and Vestia foetida

Spectral data 
The lambda-max for isoquercetin is 254.8 and 352.6 nm.

Potential clinical uses 
Isoquercetin is presently being investigated for prevention of thromboembolism in selected cancer patients and as an anti-fatigue agent in kidney cancer patients treated with sunitinib.

There is a single case report of its use in the successful treatment of prurigo nodularis, a difficult to treat pruritic eruption of the skin.

However it belongs to the PAINS (Pan-assay interference compounds) categories of chemicals.

References

See also 
 Quercitrin

Quercetin glycosides
Flavonoid glucosides